Yasushi Akashi (明石 康 Akashi Yasushi, born January 19, 1931, in Hinai, Akita Prefecture) is a senior Japanese diplomat and United Nations administrator.

Overview 

Akashi graduated with Bachelor of Arts degree from the University of Tokyo in 1954, studied as a Fulbright Scholar at the University of Virginia, and later at The Fletcher School of Law and Diplomacy at Tufts University. As a politically appointed International Civil Servant at the Headquarters of the United Nations Secretariat in New York City, he held positions as Under-Secretary-General of Public Information, Under-Secretary-General for Disarmament Affairs and Undersecretary-General for Humanitarian Affairs and Emergency Relief Coordinator.

Among many other additional assignments, he was the Secretary-General's Personal Representative for the war in the former Yugoslavia. He also supervised the Cambodian peace negotiations and subsequent elections in 1993. Despite his successes there, he was strongly criticized for his subsequent role in the Balkans, particularly for failing to enforce the safety of civilians in a number of safe zones, such as Goražde, and his inability to prevent the genocide in Srebrenica.

Akashi was expected to visit Sri Lanka in the last week of September 2006 to help facilitate negotiations between the Tamil Tigers and the Sri Lankan government. In the past, Akashi has met with JVP official Somawansa Amarasinghe.

He ran for Governor of Tokyo in the election of 1999 with the support of the Liberal Democratic Party and New Komeito coalition, but came in fourth place.

Honors
Honorary citizen of Sochi, Russia (1989).
Eminent member of the Sergio Vieira de Mello Foundation.
Sri Lanka Rathna award, Sri Lanka - August 19, 2019.

References 

1931 births
Japanese diplomats
Living people
People from Akita Prefecture
Tokyo gubernatorial candidates
University of Virginia alumni
The Fletcher School at Tufts University alumni
Under-Secretaries-General of the United Nations
Japanese officials of the United Nations
Fulbright alumni